Quincy University (QU) is a private Franciscan university in Quincy, Illinois. It was founded in 1860 and enrolls about 1,100 students.

History

A small group of Franciscan friars left Germany in 1858 to serve the German-speaking population in what was then the frontier state of Illinois. On February 6, 1860, they founded the institution as St. Francis Solanus College. This school was established at the corner of 8th and Maine Street. Under the leadership of Fr. Anselm Mueller, who served as president for a total of 37 years beginning in 1863, the institution moved to its current location on what is now College Avenue.

Following two other name changes during the twentieth century, the current name, Quincy University, was adopted in 1993. The university name was used in part to recognize the addition of graduate programs.

From its founding, Quincy University has embraced a deep commitment to the liberal arts while recognizing the importance of professional programs. The earliest course catalogs, from the 1870s, combined a strong focus on the liberal arts with courses in accounting and other "commercial" programs. Quincy University continues to offer majors in the liberal arts and in the professions. 

Quincy University typically enrolled under 300 students until the 1930s. The first woman enrolled at the university in the 1920s, and women were regularly admitted beginning in 1932. From the 1870s until the 1950s, the great majority of campus courses and activities occurred in Francis Hall, a large building renowned for its beauty and strong German architectural influences.

Quincy University was involved in educating Army reservists and Navy cadets during World War II, and enrollment grew after the Second World War. The university first enrolled over 1,000 students in the late 1950s. In response to this enrollment growth, several new buildings were planned and put up during the 1950s and 1960s. 

The Franciscan friars made up the majority of the university faculty until the late twentieth century. The distinctive Franciscan intellectual tradition remains central to the mission and values of the university. Since the founding of the institution, many Franciscan friars in the Midwest have been educated at Quincy University. Today, the university is home to people of all faiths, who are welcomed in the Franciscan tradition of hospitality.

In 2016 the university announced that it was having significant financial issues. At the time of the announcement the school was running a $5 million deficit. A plan was developed to cut costs, and major donors helped get the university past the crisis. In November 2018, the university received $2.25 million from the U.S. Department of Education to expand students' access to science, technology, engineering and math.

In 2020, the university initiated its distinctive Success by Design program, in which each undergraduate student completes and annually updates an individualized student success plan. The program also emphasizes high-impact learning experiences, such as undergraduate research and internships, along with multiple sources of mentoring and advising.

In 2021, the Oakley family of Quincy announced a $6.5 million gift to the university which included naming of the Oakley School of Business. This gift is more than double the previous largest gift to the university.

Academics

Quincy University is organized into five schools:

School of Fine Arts & Communication
School of Humanities
School of Science and Technology
Oakley School of Business
School of Education & Human Services

At the undergraduate level, QU requires completion of the Bonaventure general education program, which includes a significant service requirement for all students. Bachelor of Science and Bachelor of Arts degrees are offered in 46 major areas of concentration. The university also supports a variety of non-degree programs and multiple degree-completion options for non-traditional students. Courses are offered in traditional, online, or hybrid formats. 

At the graduate level, QU offers a Master of Business Administration (MBA) degree, a Master of Science in education (M.S.Ed.) degree and a (M.S. Ed) Master of Science in education in counseling degree. The MBA degree is offered entirely online. 

Classroom technologies and resources are tailored to the needs of specific academic programs. New or updated and renovated laboratories in computer science, cybersecurity, business analytics, biology, and chemistry are available, as is the John “Pete” Brown Mock Trial courtroom.

Accreditations
Quincy University is accredited by the Higher Learning Commission. QU also has specialized accreditation from the Council for Accreditation of Counseling and Related Educational Programs (CACREP).

Campus
Quincy University's compact, walkable campus is located in a residential area, a few blocks away from Quincy's Broadway Avenue shopping and business district.

Historic Francis Hall is at the center of campus and was built and expanded between 1871 and 1898. The campus also features distinctive examples of Mid-Century modern architecture in its residence halls and classroom and administration buildings. Friar's Field, a large lawn that held various athletic fields during the nineteenth and twentieth centuries, now creates a park-like setting for the campus. The newest additions to campus include a large health and fitness center and an apartment-style residence hall.

The historic campus holds several noteworthy traditional and contemporary public art installations. The Brenner Library includes the highly regarded Gray Gallery, which features art exhibitions throughout the year.

The university chapel was built in 1911 and has been renovated on several occasions. The chapel design was shortened and modified to preserve the baseball field then located just to the north of Francis Hall.

A former Franciscan seminary is now part of Quincy University, just a few minutes to the north of the university's historic campus. Now called the North Campus, this extensively renovated facility houses most of the Division of Science and Technology, the Connie Niemann Center for Music, and the Quincy Media Inc. television studio. The university's soccer stadium and softball complex are located adjacent to the North Campus. The football stadium and baseball field are part of the main campus and feature distinctive limestone walls. The football and baseball facilities were built in the 1930s and have been extensively renovated.

Campus life at Quincy University involves several student clubs and activities, including three Greek-letter organizations. Greek houses are located on campus.

Each year, the Inaugural ceremony brings together faculty, staff, new students, and parents to celebrate the beginning of the university experience for new students. Following a procession by the faculty in academic regalia, the ceremony takes place in St. Francis Solanus Church, a Franciscan parish located across the street from Quincy University.

Students and alumni
The student body at Quincy University is about 52% men and 48% women. Most students come from Illinois and Missouri, but several other states in the Midwest and South are well represented at QU. Over 15,000 Quincy University alumni live in all 50 states and 12 foreign countries.

Athletics

Quincy University is a member of NCAA Division II and has been a part of the Great Lakes Valley Conference (GLVC) for most sports since the 1995–96 school year. Men's volleyball competes in the Midwestern Intercollegiate Volleyball Association as a de facto member of NCAA Division I. Sprint football, a weight-restricted form of American football that is not governed by the NCAA, will become QU's newest varsity sport in fall 2022. Several teams have had significant national success, with men's soccer winning 11 NAIA national championships.

Men's sports
 Baseball
 Basketball
 Bowling
 Cross country
 Football  
 Golf
 Lacrosse
 Soccer
 Sprint football (starting in 2022–23)
 Swimming
 Tennis
 Track and field
 Volleyball
 Wrestling
 
Women's sports
 Basketball
 Bowling
 Cross country
 Golf
 Lacrosse
 Soccer
 Softball
 Swimming
 Tennis
 Track and field
 Volleyball
 Wrestling

Notes

Notable alumni
 Venerable Augustine Tolton (1854–1897), first openly African-American Catholic priest
 Rick Hummel (b. 1946), Hall of Fame baseball writer
 Josh Kinney (b. 1979), relief pitcher for the Seattle Mariners
 John Mahoney (1940–2018), television and theatre actor
 Zoe Nicholson, equality activist, speaker and writer
 James Pankow (b. 1947), trombonist for the band Chicago
 Michael A. Perry (b. 1954), Minister General of the Order of Friars Minor
 Josh Rabe (b. 1978), former outfielder for the Minnesota Twins
 Lindell Shumake (b. 1949), Republican member of the Missouri House of Representatives
 Francis G. Slay (b. 1955), former mayor of St. Louis, Missouri
 Dietrich C. Smith (1840–1914), former Republican Congressman from Illinois
 John M. Sullivan (b. 1959), Illinois State Senator
 Michael Swango (b. 1954), prolific serial killer and physician
 Scott L. Thoele, U.S. Army National Guard general
 Mary Jo White (b. 1941), Pennsylvania State Senator

References

External links
 
 Quincy University Athletics website

 
Franciscan universities and colleges
Liberal arts colleges in Illinois
Education in Adams County, Illinois
Tourist attractions in Quincy, Illinois
Quincy–Hannibal area
Association of Catholic Colleges and Universities
Midwestern Intercollegiate Volleyball Association
Educational institutions established in 1860
1860 establishments in Illinois
Roman Catholic Diocese of Springfield in Illinois
Catholic universities and colleges in Illinois